Rony Mariano Bezerra (born March 21, 1984), better known as Rony Jason, is a Brazilian professional mixed martial artist who competed in the Featherweight division of the Ultimate Fighting Championship. A professional MMA competitor since 2006, Bezerra was also the Featherweight winner of Globo's The Ultimate Fighter: Brazil. His nickname is based on Friday the 13th film character Jason Voorhees; he wears the Voorhees mask on his walk to the Octagon.

Background
Born and raised in Brazil, Bezerra began training in Brazilian jiu-jitsu at the age of 16, and was talented, winning various titles. Bezerra has also trained in kickboxing and judo. Bezerra attended law school before dropping out to further pursue a career in professional mixed martial arts.

Mixed martial arts career

Early career
Bezerra made his professional MMA debut in 2006, where he fought Alessandro Cabeca in his professional debut, winning via second-round TKO.

At only 2-0, Bezerra took a fight against another up-and-comer, and future UFC Interim Bantamweight Champion, Renan Barão. The fight was very closely contested and ended in a split decision loss for Bezerra. He won his next fight via submission before suffering his second loss to Joao Paulo Rodrigues de Souza. Bezerra bounced back from the loss with first round submission wins over future UFC fighter, Felipe Arantes and tough journeyman, Felipe Alves.

On December 5, 2009 at the Platinum Fight Brazil 2 fight card, Bezerra fought future Bellator contender, Genair da Silva. He lost the fight via doctor stoppage after the end of round two. After the loss, Bezerra went on a five fight winning streak, where he claimed multiple titles for several promotions, and was named BloodyElbow.com's 2012 #1 Bantamweight prospect, despite never fighting in the division.

The Ultimate Fighter
In March 2012, it was revealed that Bezerra was selected to be a participant on The Ultimate Fighter: Brazil. Bezerra defeated Dileno Lopes via technical knockout in the first round to move into the Ultimate Fighter house, and become an official cast member.

Bezerra was selected as the first overall pick by Wanderlei Silva, to be a part of Team Wanderlei. In the last quarterfinal fight, Bezerra was selected to fight his close friend and training partner Anistavio Meideiros. Bezerra won the fight via technical submission after applying an armbar to Meideiros, nearly breaking his arm which forced the referee to intervene and stop the fight.

In the semi-final round, Bezerra was matched-up against Hugo Viana from Team Vitor. After three rounds, Bezerra was declared the winner via unanimous decision. The win moved him into the finals set to take place at UFC 147.

Ultimate Fighting Championship
Bezerra officially made his UFC debut at UFC 147 on June 23, 2012 against Godofredo Pepey to determine the Featherweight winner of The Ultimate Fighter: Brazil. He won the fight via unanimous decision.

Bezerra fought Sam Sicilia on October 13, 2012 at UFC 153. After a hard back-and-forth slug fest, Bezerra dropped Sicilia with a big right and finished with hammerfists to earn the second-round TKO stoppage. He won Knockout of the Night honors with his performance.

Bezerra next faced The Ultimate Fighter: The Smashes fighter Mike Wilkinson on June 8, 2013 at UFC on Fuel TV 10. He won the fight via submission in the first round.

Bezerra was expected to face Jeremy Stephens on October 9, 2013 at UFC Fight Night 29.  However, Bezerra pulled out of the bout citing an injury (lumbar hernia). The bout eventually took place on November 9, 2013 at UFC Fight Night 32. Bezerra lost the fight via knockout in the first round.

Bezerra faced Steven Siler on March 23, 2014 at UFC Fight Night 38. He won the fight via a controversial TKO stoppage in the first round. Siler was initially dropped by two punches from Bezerra. Siler, having his back on the mat, immediately threw an up-kick as soon as Bezerra proceeded to walk toward him. At the very same time the referee stepped in to stop the fight as a conscious Siler was attempting to defend himself.

Bezerra faced Robbie Peralta on May 31, 2014 at The Ultimate Fighter Brazil 3 Finale. He lost the back-and-forth fight via split decision.

Bezerra was expected to face Tom Niinimäki on December 20, 2014 at UFC Fight Night 58.  However, Bezerra pulled out of the bout on December 10 and was replaced by promotional newcomer Renato Moicano.

Bezerra faced Damon Jackson on May 30, 2015 at UFC Fight Night 67. He won the fight via triangle choke submission in the first round.  The victory also produced a Performance of the Night bonus. On June 18, 2015, it was announced that Bezerra tested positive for hydrochlorothiazide, which is a banned diuretic, therefore his submission victory was overturned and he received a nine-month suspension. The UFC  rescinded Jason's $50,000 "Performance of the Night" award.

Bezerra faced Dennis Bermudez on August 6, 2016 at UFC Fight Night 92. He lost the fight by unanimous decision.

Bezerra faced Jeremy Kennedy on March 11, 2017 at UFC Fight Night 106. He lost the bout by unanimous decision.

On October 10, 2017, Bezerra was released from UFC roster.

Post-UFC career
After being released from the UFC, Bezerra signed with Lux Fight League. He made his promotional debut against Diego Lopes at Lux 004 on March 15, 2019, losing the fight via unanimous decision.

Bezerra made his sophomore appearance in the promotion against Edgar Díaz Guzman at Lux 005 on July 19, 2019. He won the fight via first-round knockout.

Next Bezerra faced Alexander Grozin at RCC Intro 6 on November 16, 2019. He lost the fight via unanimous decision.

Controversies
On November 9, 2013, after losing to Jeremy Stephens at UFC Fight Night 32: Belfort vs. Henderson, Bezerra punched a hole in a wall at the backstage where he required a dozen stitches and was suspended 30 days from Brazilian MMA Athletic Commission (CABMMA).

In October 2017, two videos were released where Bezerra was seen yelling and striking his sister who was lying on the pavement with multiple bystanders attempting to restrain him.

Championships and awards

Mixed martial arts
Ultimate Fighting Championship
The Ultimate Fighter: Brazil Featherweight Tournament Winner
Knockout of the Night (One time) 
Performance of the Night (One time - forfeited)
Max Fight
MF Featherweight Championship (One time)

Mixed martial arts record

|-
|Loss
|align=center|15–9 (1)
|Alexander Grozin
|Decision (unanimous)
|RCC Intro 6
|
|align=center|3
|align=center|5:00
|Yekaterinburg, Russia
|
|-
|Win
|align=center|15–8 (1)
|Edgar Díaz Guzman
|TKO (punches)
|Lux Fight League 5
|
|align=center|1
|align=center|2:05
|Mexico City, Mexico
|
|-
|Loss
|align=center|14–8 (1)
|Diego Lopes
|Decision (unanimous)
|Lux Fight League 4
|
|align=center|3
|align=center|5:00
|Mexico City, Mexico
|
|-
|Loss
|align=center|14–7 (1)
|Jeremy Kennedy
|Decision (unanimous)
|UFC Fight Night: Belfort vs. Gastelum
|
|align=center|3
|align=center|5:00
|Fortaleza, Brazil
|
|-
|Loss
|align=center|14–6 (1)
|Dennis Bermudez
|Decision (unanimous)
|UFC Fight Night: Rodríguez vs. Caceres
|
|align=center|3
|align=center|5:00
|Salt Lake City, Utah, United States
|
|-
|NC
|align=center|14–5 (1)
|Damon Jackson
|NC (overturned)
|UFC Fight Night: Condit vs. Alves
|
|align=center|1
|align=center|3:31
|Goiânia, Brazil
|
|-
|Loss
|align=center|14–5
|Robbie Peralta
|Decision (split)
|The Ultimate Fighter Brazil 3 Finale: Miocic vs. Maldonado
|
|align=center|3
|align=center|5:00
|São Paulo, Brazil
|
|-
|Win
|align=center|14–4
|Steven Siler
|TKO (punches)
|UFC Fight Night: Shogun vs. Henderson 2
|
|align=center|1
|align=center|1:17
|Natal, Brazil
|
|-
|Loss
|align=center|13–4
|Jeremy Stephens
|KO (head kick)
|UFC Fight Night: Belfort vs. Henderson 2
|
|align=center|1
|align=center|0:40
|Goiânia, Brazil
|
|-
|Win
|align=center|13–3
|Mike Wilkinson
|Technical Submission (triangle choke)
|UFC on Fuel TV: Nogueira vs. Werdum
|
|align=center|1
|align=center|1:24
|Fortaleza, Brazil
|
|-
|Win
|align=center|12–3
|Sam Sicilia
|TKO (punches)
|UFC 153
|
|align=center|2
|align=center|4:16
|Rio de Janeiro, Brazil
||
|-
|Win
|align=center|11–3
|Godofredo Pepey
|Decision (unanimous)
|UFC 147
|
|align=center|3
|align=center|5:00
|Belo Horizonte, Brazil
|
|-
|Win
|align=center|10–3
|Reginaldo Vieira
|Submission (armbar)
|Max Fight 10
|
|align=center|1
|align=center|1:25
|São Paulo, Brazil
|
|-
|Win
|align=center|9–3
|Anderson de Deus
|Submission (arm-triangle choke)
|High Fight Rock 1
|
|align=center|1
|align=center|3:12
|Goiânia, Brazil
|
|-
|Win
|align=center|8–3
|Marlon Medeiros
|Submission (triangle choke)
|Max Fight 9
|
|align=center|1
|align=center|3:14
|Campinas, Brazil
|
|-
|Win
|align=center|7–3
|Diego Ribeiro
|TKO (punches)
|Face to Face 4
|
|align=center|1
|align=center|0:43
|Recreio dos Bandeirantes, Brazil
|
|-
|Win
|align=center|6–3
|Jurandir Sardinha
|Submission (triangle choke)
|Win Fight & Entertainment 8
|
|align=center|1
|align=center|1:15
|Salvador, Brazil
|
|-
|Loss
|align=center|5–3
|Genair da Silva
|TKO (doctor stoppage)
|Platinum Fight Brazil 2
|
|align=center|2
|align=center|5:00
|Rio de Janeiro, Brazil
|
|-
|Win
|align=center|5–2
|Felipe Alves
|Submission (rear-naked choke)
|Hawk Fight Championship
|
|align=center|1
|align=center|0:38
|Rio Negrinho, Brazil
|
|-
|Win
|align=center|4–2
|Felipe Arantes
|Submission (triangle choke)
|Samurai Fight Combat
|
|align=center|1
|align=center|4:53
|Curitiba, Brazil
|
|-
|Loss
|align=center|3–2
|João Paulo Rodrigues
|Submission (stomp)
|Platinum Fight Brazil 1
|
|align=center|2
|align=center|2:30
|Natal, Brazil
|
|-
|Win
|align=center|3–1
|Renan Falcon
|Submission (armbar)
|Leal Combat MMA
|
|align=center|1
|align=center|N/A
|Mossoró, Brazil
|
|-
|Loss
|align=center|2–1
|Renan Barão
|Decision (split)
|Cage Fight Nordeste
|
|align=center|3
|align=center|5:00
|Natal, Brazil
|
|-
|Win
|align=center|2–0
|Fernando Gardner
|KO (stomp)
|Hikari Fight
|
|align=center|1
|align=center|N/A
|Natal, Brazil
|
|-
|Win
|align=center|1–0
|Alessandro Cabeca
|TKO (punches) 
|Nordeste Mega Fight Vale Tudo 2
|
|align=center|2
|align=center|4:15
|Mossoró, Brazil
|

Mixed martial arts exhibition record

|-
|Win
|align=center|3–0
|Hugo Viana
|Decision (unanimous)
|The Ultimate Fighter: Brazil
| (airdate)
|align=center|3
|align=center|5:00
|São Paulo, Brazil
|
|-
|Win
|align=center|2–0
|Anistavio Medeiros
|Submission (armbar)
|The Ultimate Fighter: Brazil
| (airdate)
|align=center|1
|align=center|N/A
|São Paulo, Brazil
|
|-
|Win
|align=center|1–0
|Dileno Lopes
|TKO (punches)
|The Ultimate Fighter: Brazil
| (airdate)
|align=center|1
|align=center|0:00
|São Paulo, Brazil
|
|-

See also
 List of current UFC fighters
 List of male mixed martial artists
 List of The Ultimate Fighter winners

References

External links
 
 
 

1984 births
Brazilian male judoka
Brazilian male kickboxers
Brazilian male mixed martial artists
Brazilian practitioners of Brazilian jiu-jitsu
Brazilian sportspeople in doping cases
Brazilian male taekwondo practitioners
Doping cases in mixed martial arts
Mixed martial artists utilizing taekwondo
Mixed martial artists utilizing judo
Mixed martial artists utilizing Brazilian jiu-jitsu
Living people
People awarded a black belt in Brazilian jiu-jitsu
Ultimate Fighting Championship male fighters
Sportspeople from Ceará